Mayo Lake is a lake of Yukon, Canada.

See also
List of lakes in Yukon

References
 National Resources Canada

Lakes of Yukon